The District Council of Swan Reach (formerly District Council of Blanchetown) was a local government area in the Murraylands of South Australia from 1888 to 1933.

History
The council was established in January 1888 by promulgation of the District Councils Act 1887. It occupied the hundreds of Skurray, Fisher, Nildottie and Paisley.

In 1898 the newly-gazetted hundreds of Murbko and Bakara (in the County of Albert) were added to the district.

In 1920 the council name was changed to 'Swan Reach'.

In September 1933 the District Council of Keyneton amalgamated with Swan Reach to become new District Council of Keyneton and Swan Reach (later called Sedan).

References

Swan Reach, District Council of
1888 establishments in Australia
1933 disestablishments in Australia